Planophila is a genus of green algae in the order Chaetopeltidales.

References

External links

Chlorophyceae genera
Chaetopeltidales